Tom Armstrong (born 4 April 1954 in Belfast, Northern Ireland) is a Northern Irish former footballer.

Playing career
Armstrong scored 21 goals for Ards F.C. during the 1978–79 Irish League.

San Diego Sockers

Signing for the San Diego Sockers in 1979, Armstrong expressed gratefulness in escaping the then unsubsiding Northern Irish civil war.

References 

1954 births
Association footballers from Northern Ireland
Expatriate soccer players in the United States
Expatriate sportspeople from Northern Ireland in the United States
San Diego Sockers (NASL) players
Association footballers from Belfast
Expatriate association footballers from Northern Ireland
Association football forwards
North American Soccer League players
San Jose Earthquakes (1974–1988) players
Living people